Troyan is a town remembering the name of Roman Emperor Trajan, in Lovech Province in central Bulgaria with population of 21,997 inhabitants, as of December 2009. It is the administrative centre of the homonymous Troyan Municipality. The river of Beli Osam passes through the heart of the town.
The 2021 Census indicates that the population of the Trojan was 18,449 inhabitants. The ethnic distribution of the inhabitants (as of 2009) is ethnic Bulgarians (87.29%), with minorities being Roma (1.23%) and Turks (1.03%). The ethnicity for 10,21% of inhabitants is not known. 
Donka Mihaylova of Bulgarian Socialist Party has been the town's mayor since 2011.

History 

Troyan was named a town in 1868, when it developed as a craft center for the region. After the liberation it grows slowly. A spark in the town growth was the creation of a small water electrical plant and textile factories. In 1948, the town was connected to the railway Lovech – Levski – Svishtov. Later in time factories producing electrical motors, electrotechnical products, building machines, wool and furniture developed in the town.

Geography
The river of Beli Osam passes through the heart of the town.

Nature 

The Troyan region is home to three National Reserves: Kozia Stena, Steneto and Severen Jendem, part of the larger Central Balkan National Park. The reserves are rich in interesting rock formations, waterfalls and wild life. Most of the interesting spots are tourist-accessible.

Culture 

The Troyan region is home to the cultural and historical site of the Troyan Monastery. August 15 is the day of the Monastery's Patron Saint, when thousands of people from the country gather to celebrate and see a unique icon of Mary. The icon is unique in that Mary has three hands made of silver. The origins of the icon are unknown but there are many stories, some of which involve miracles.

The town is famous for its traditional pottery, probably developed partly as a result of the qualities of the local clay soil. Pottery was a main source of income for the local craftsmen during the Bulgarian Renaissance age. Now handmade pottery items are sold as souvenirs to tourists. Fine examples of traditional pottery can be seen in the town's museum, across from the municipal building.

Also notable are the Nunki Complex and the St Paraskeva Church, both built in the first half of the 19th century.

The production of premium quality plum brandy (rakia) has become a part of the local culture. In connection with this, the town holds the annual Festival of the Plum in the autumn. Plum brandy from Troyan has gained national and international acclaim at major showcases.

The official day of Troyan is October 14, the day of the town's patron saint, St Petka Paraskeva.

Troyan Peak in Tangra Mountains on Livingston Island in the South Shetland Islands is named after the town.

Population 

The table below shows the changes of the city's population in the post-World War II years (1946–2009)

Industry 

Troyan is the home of the large Actavis  generic pharmaceuticals plant as well as the light machinery factories Elma and Mashstroi. There is located also plywood mill Welde. Another major industry is the famous plum brandy (slivova rakia) production brewery Vinprom-Troyan.

In Troyan is situated one of the largest chair producers in Bulgaria – "Elimex – Ivan Radevski". Elimex – Ivan Radevski is an established company with more than 20 years of experience in the furniture industry, strong traditions and modern style consciousness. The company is specialized in the production of massive wood chairs mainly from oak, beech, birch etc... ELIMEX is among the companies with the highest production capacity in Bulgaria with 10 000 chairs per month, and the only company in Bulgaria with experience and traditions in bending wood parts for our chairs.

Notable people 
 Andrey Andreev, industrialist, philanthropist
 Petar Dachev, long jumper, gold medallist at the 2000 European Athletics Indoor Championships
 Vladimir Iliev, biathlete
 Stanimir Belomazhev, three-times European champion and double World vice-champion in ski orienteering

Schools 
 Kliment Ohridski Secondary School
 Vasil Levski Secondary School
 Technical High School of Troyan
 Art and Crafts High School
 Ivan Hadgiiski Primary School
 Otets Paisii Primary School
 St. St. Cyril and Methodius Elementary School
 Christo Botev Elementary School

Institutions 

 Military Geographic Centre of the Bulgarian Armed Forces
 Institute for Mountain Agriculture, part of the National Centre for Agricultural Sciences

Honour
Troyan Peak on Livingston Island in the South Shetland Islands, Antarctica is named after Troyan.

International relations

Twin towns — sister cities
Troyan  is twinned with:
 Dojran, North Macedonia
 Ellwangen, Germany
 Pernes-les-Fontaines, France
 Vigneux-sur-Seine, France

Gallery

References

External links 

 Official website of Troyan
 Tourism in Troyan, Bulgaria website
 News from Troyan
 CityNet Troyan OnLine)

1868 establishments in Bulgaria
Towns in Bulgaria
Populated places in Lovech Province